Harrison A. Bronson (November 19, 1873 – April 22, 1947) was an American legislator and attorney who served as a justice of the Supreme Court of North Dakota from 1918 to 1924. He died at the age of 73 in 1947.

Born in Nunica, Michigan, Bronson received a B.A. from the University of North Dakota in 1894 and an M.A. from the same institution the following year. He received a law degree from the University of Minnesota in 1901. From 1913 to 1917, he was a member of the North Dakota State Senate. He won election to the state supreme court in 1918, beginning his term early due to a vacancy by the resignation of Justice Andrew A. Bruce in December 1918.

External links
North Dakota Supreme Court biography

1873 births
1947 deaths
University of Minnesota Law School alumni
North Dakota state senators
Justices of the North Dakota Supreme Court
University of North Dakota alumni
North Dakota lawyers